The Huis van Alijn (Dutch for: Alijn Hospital, literally House of Alijn) is a museum located on the Kraanlei in Ghent, Belgium. The collection revolves around local culture and daily life in the 20th century.

External links
 Official Website

Museums in Ghent
History museums in Belgium